Michael Ray may refer to:

 Michael Ray (guitarist) (born 1960), American guitarist and former member of Plasmatics
 Michael Ray (singer) (born 1988), American country music singer active beginning in 2010
Michael Ray (album), his self-titled debut album
 Michael Ray (trumpeter) (born 1952), American jazz trumpeter

See also